The 2013–14 Maltese FA Trophy was the 76th season since its establishment. For the second season, the competition included all teams from Malta and Gozo. The competition began on 1 September 2013 and ended on 4 May 2014 with the final in Ta' Qali Stadium. The defending champions were Hibernians, having won their 10th Maltese Cup last season, but were eliminated by Pietà Hotspurs in the fourth round. Valletta were crowned winners after defeating Sliema Wanderers 1–0 in the final, therefore qualifying for the first qualifying round of the 2014–15 UEFA Europa League.

Hibernians were the defending champions, but were eliminated in the Fourth Round by Pietà Hotspurs.

Calendar
Matches began on 1 September 2013 and concluded with the final on 4 May 2014.

Preliminary round
Entering this round 2 clubs from the Maltese Third Division and Gozo Football League Second Division. These matches took place between 1 September 2013.

|colspan="3" style="background:#fcc;"|1 September 2013

|}

First round
In this round a total of 24 teams compete. Matches were played on 4, 5, 7 & 8 September 2013.

|colspan="3" style="background:#fcc;"|4 September 2013

|-
|colspan="3" style="background:#fcc;"|5 September 2013

|-
|colspan="3" style="background:#fcc;"|7 September 2013

|-
|colspan="3" style="background:#fcc;"|8 September 2013

|}

Second round
In this round a total of 40 teams compete. Entering this round were the 12 winners from the First Round along with the 14 Maltese First Division clubs and the 14 Maltese Second Division clubs. Matches were played on 27 October 2013.

|colspan="3" style="background:#fcc;"|25 October 2013

|-
|colspan="3" style="background:#fcc;"|26 October 2013

|-
|colspan="3" style="background:#fcc;"|27 October 2013

|}

Third round
Entering this round were the 20 winners from the Second Round along with the 12 Maltese Premier League clubs. Matches were played on 27 November 2013.

|colspan="3" style="background:#fcc;"|24 November 2013

|-
|colspan="3" style="background:#fcc;"|26 November 2013

|-
|colspan="3" style="background:#fcc;"|27 November 2013

|}

Fourth round
Entering this round were the 16 winners from the Third Round. Matches were played on 18 January 2014.

|colspan="3" style="background:#fcc;"|19 January 2014

|-
|colspan="3" style="background:#fcc;"|21 January 2014

|-
|colspan="3" style="background:#fcc;"|22 January 2014

|}

Quarter-finals
Entering this round were the 8 winners from the Fourth Round. These matches took place on 15 and 16 February 2014.

Semi-finals

Final

References

External links

Maltese Cup
Cup
Maltese FA Trophy seasons